USCGC William Sparling (WPC-1154) will be the United States Coast Guard's 54th  cutter.

Design

Like her sister ships, William Sparling is designed to perform search and rescue missions, port security, and the interception of smugglers.  She is armed with a remotely-controlled, gyro-stabilized 25 mm autocannon, four crew served M2 Browning machine guns, and light arms. She is equipped with a stern launching ramp, that allows her to launch or retrieve a water-jet propelled high-speed auxiliary boat, without first coming to a stop.  Her high-speed boat has over-the-horizon capability, and is useful for inspecting other vessels, and deploying boarding parties.

The crew's drinking water needs are met through a desalination unit.  The crew mess is equipped with a television with satellite reception.

Operational career
On 15 August 2022, it was announced that William Sparling would be homeported in Boston, Massachusetts with an expected delivery date of July 2023 under commanding officer Jacklyn Kokomoor.

Namesake

In 2010, Master Chief Petty Officer of the Coast Guard  Charles "Skip" W. Bowen, who was then the United States Coast Guard's most senior non-commissioned officer, proposed that all 58 cutters in the Sentinel class should be named after enlisted sailors in the Coast Guard, or one of its precursor services, who were recognized for their heroism.  The Coast Guard chose William Sparling as the namesake of the 54th cutter.  Sparling, and three other Coast Guard sailors, piloted the first landing craft during the United States's first amphibious landing, in the Pacific Theater, during World War II.  Sparling, and his three colleagues were each awarded a Silver Star medal for this task.  His colleagues Daniel Tarr, Harold Miller and Glen Harris have Sentinel-class cutters named after them.

References

Sentinel-class cutters
Ships of the United States Coast Guard
Ships built in Lockport, Louisiana